Samuel Gardner Melville (August 20, 1936 – March 9, 1989) was an American film and television actor. He appeared as a guest star on many television programs of the 1960s and 1970s. He portrayed Officer Mike Danko in four seasons of Aaron Spelling's ABC series The Rookies, and The Bear in the 1978 surfing movie Big Wednesday, with Celia Kaye as his unnamed "bride".

Melville also had small parts in Hour of the Gun (1967) playing the role of Morgan Earp, The Thomas Crown Affair (1968) starring Steve McQueen, as Lieutenant James Crandall / Schmidt on Hogan's Heroes (1966), and the television disaster film Terror in the Sky (1971) as the co-pilot. On Gunsmoke and Hawaii Five-O, both on CBS, he played villains as a guest-star. However, on the episode "A Mule ... Like the Army's Mule" of the syndicated anthology series Death Valley Days, Melville portrayed United States Army Lt. Jason Beal, who befriended Sandy King, played by Luke Halpin, the youngest member of the Curly Bill Brocius outlaw gang. In 1967, he guest starred in an episode of the CBS western, Dundee and the Culhane.

In 1970, Melville was cast as Indian agent John Clum in the Death Valley Days episode, "Clum's Constabulary", hosted by Dale Robertson. In the story line, Clum recruits an elite team of Apaches to aid the U.S. Cavalry in the Southwest but faces opposition within the white community. Tris Coffin was cast as Captain Loren Phillips and John Considine as Lago.

Melville again portrayed a villain on the 1980s CBS drama Scarecrow and Mrs. King, which starred Kate Jackson as Mrs. King, and he later portrayed Mrs. King's ex-husband and father of her children on that series. He also played opposite Kate Jackson as her husband in the 1970s series The Rookies. He guest starred as a jewel thief, alongside Janie Fricke, in a seventh season episode of CBS's The Dukes of Hazzard titled "Happy Birthday, General Lee".

Melville was born in Fillmore, Utah, and died from heart failure in Los Angeles. He was survived by his wife, Annie.

Filmography

References

External links 

1936 births
1989 deaths
American male film actors
American male television actors
Male actors from Utah
People from Fillmore, Utah
Male actors from Los Angeles
Burials at Forest Lawn Memorial Park (Hollywood Hills)
20th-century American male actors